Seer Green and Jordans railway station is a railway station near the village of Seer Green in Buckinghamshire, England. It also serves the nearby village of Jordans. It is served by Chiltern Railways trains.

History
The station opened to the public on 1 January 1915 on what was the Great Western and Great Central Joint Railway, which had been opened in 1906. It had previously been a private golf platform. The station was originally called Beaconsfield Golf Links Halt due to its close proximity to that golf club, and was renamed Seer Green on 16 December 1918 and Seer Green & Jordans on 25 September 1950 and reverted to Seer Green on 6 May 1974.

The station was transferred from the Western Region of British Rail to the London Midland Region on 24 March 1974.

Services
The Monday - Friday off-peak service consists of:

1 train per hour to 
1 train per hour to 

Additional trains run at peak times. Other timetabled services run at weekends.

Most services from this station are operated by Class 165 trains, although some peak and late night/early morning services are operated by Class 168 trains.

References

External links

 Chiltern Railways

Railway stations in Buckinghamshire
Former Great Western and Great Central Joint Railway stations
Railway stations in Great Britain opened in 1914
Railway stations served by Chiltern Railways
1914 establishments in England